Nikolay Bozhov  (born 18 July 1977 in Sofia) is a Bulgarian former football forward who most recently played for Vitosha Bistritsa.

Youth retirement and business
Bozhov started his youth career in Bulgarian powerhouse Levski Sofia's academy. At the age of 17, he retired from football because of a waist injury. Bozhov's father died soon after Bozhov finished his compulsory military service, so he had to take charge of his father's ironmonger's shop. The business quickly developed and the shop soon grew to a full-fledged enterprise. Bozhov imported goods from China and supplied local wholesale dealers. At the time, Bozhov did not even consider a return to football, as his business provided a good source of income and his waist problems continued.

Senior career
In 2005, on the insistence of a friend, Bozhov started appearing for amateur side Vihar Gorublyane, returning to football after a ten-year break. He played for the team for two seasons in the lower divisions of Bulgaria's football pyramid. While a part-time player at Vihar, Bozhov did not receive any salary. In 2007, the club merged with B PFG side Akademik Sofia, thus Bozhov indirectly became part of that team.

Akademik Sofia
In June 2007, at age 30, Bozhov signed his first professional contract with Akademik Sofia. Nonetheless, he was not a full-time footballer for the club and would sometimes attend training as rarely as once or twice a week. He made his debut on 18 August 2007, during the 2007–08 season, in a 1–1 away draw against Yantra Gabrovo, coming on as a substitute for Troyan Radulov. In the next week he scored his first goal for a 2–1 away win against Velbazhd Kyustendil. In his first season as a professional footballer, Bozhov made 18 appearances in the B PFG and scored six goals.

During the following 2008–09 campaign, the Akademik manager decided to use Bozhov into the starting line-up as the team's main striker. In that season, Bozhov scored eight goals in 24 appearances.

The 2009–10 season saw Bozhov emerge as the top scorer of Akademik Sofia with 15 goals in 24 games. His goals helped the team gain promotion to the first division in Bulgaria, for the first time in 28 years. On 23 May 2010, Bozhov scored the two goals in the A PFG promotion play-off against Nesebar and was voted Akademik's best player of the 2009–10 season.

Slavia Sofia
In late May 2010, Bozhov joined Slavia Sofia on a free transfer, agreeing a one-year deal with the A PFG club. Among the reasons for Bozhov's choice to sign for Slavia was the negative effect of the world economic crisis on his business, which ceased to be profitable. While he still runs the enterprise and pays the salaries of his three employees, he can afford to train daily and attend pre-season camps outside Sofia.

He began the season in fine form for Slavia. On 7 August 2010, while 33 years old, he made his debut in the Bulgarian top division. Bozhov scored his first competitive Slavia goal 12 minutes into his debut, in the game against Minyor Pernik. In Slavia's fourth game of the season against Pirin Blagoevgrad, Bozhov scored twice. He also featured in the next game, at home against Lokomotiv Plovdiv, when he scored his fourth goal of the A PFG season. On 11 September 2010, Bozhov continued to impress with two goals in a 4–0 win against his previous team Akademik Sofia.
Bozhov was at one point sharing 5th place among the top scorers in the A PFG.
On 7 April 2011, Bozhov netted twice (including a last-minute goal with a scissor kick to send the game into extra time) in the 4:4 draw with Chernomorets Burgas in the 1/4 finals of the Bulgarian Cup. He also converted his penalty kick in the eventual shootout to decide the game, which was won by Slavia. Bozhov featured less regularly during the 2011/2012 season and was released from Slavia in late April 2012.

Club statistics
As of 31 May 2012

References

External links
 Profile at Akademik Sofia

1977 births
Living people
Footballers from Sofia
Bulgarian footballers
Akademik Sofia players
PFC Slavia Sofia players
Ħamrun Spartans F.C. players
FC Vitosha Bistritsa players
Association football forwards
First Professional Football League (Bulgaria) players
Expatriate footballers in Malta
Bulgarian expatriates in Malta